Imperial Violets (French:Violettes impériales) may refer to:

 Imperial Violets (1924 film), a French silent film
 Imperial Violets (1932 film), a French film
 Imperial Violets (operetta), a 1948 musical version
 Imperial Violets (1952 film), a French-Spanish film based on the operetta